Kinectimals (known as Kinect Animals in Japan and South Korea) is a video game for the Xbox 360 that uses Kinect, with versions also available for various mobile devices. In the game players can interact with virtual animals in a manner akin to pets, gameplay includes activities such as teaching tricks to the animal, guiding the animal around an obstacle course, and free-form play.

The video game is aimed at a young audience, particularly children, and includes eleven different virtual animals all based on wild cats. Kinectimals was developed by Frontier Developments and was a launch title for Kinect. There were also plush toys that come with scan tags that players can use to unlock new cubs.

An add-on, Kinectimals: Bear Island, was released as downloadable content on October 11, 2011, along with Kinectimals: Now with Bears!, a single retail disc that bundles Bear Island with the base game. Plushes include scan tags, which players can use to unlock new cubs. Exclusive plushes to the bear version include a FAO Schwarz plush with a scan tag and four from Build-A-Bear Workshop, featuring Champ Bear, Colorful Hearts Bear, Endless Hearts Teddy and Peace & Hearts Bear that also have scan tags. There was also another app, Kinectimals Unleashed, which features dogs in addition to more bear and wild cat cubs. The apps are now discontinued.

Gameplay 
Throughout the game players spend time using the Kinect system to feed, play with, care, and even raise an animal cub. Upon starting the game the player will visit Fur Town, where they choose one of the 6 initial cubs. When they adopt a cub, they can take a picture and name it. As they play the game, new areas, more cubs and items can be unlocked. Throughout the game there are 11 cubs. The cat-lemur fairy, Bumble (voiced by Richard Steven Horvitz) guides the player through the game. When players play games and challenges, they earn coins that can be used to buy stuff at the shop like toys, feather wands, balls, jump ropes, flying toys, radio-controlled cars, food, drinks, collars, pendants, furniture and other things. Other stuff can also be unlocked by winning gold medals. Also in the areas of the game, players can use the Plunderscope to find hidden treasures which also unlocks accessories and even use a net to catch butterflies. Players can also use the scan tags on the plush toys to unlock new cubs. A female fairy named Lina (voiced by Grey DeLisle) appears in the bear version of the game to guide the player through the game and solving Fiddler's Quest. Each of these games take place in the islands Lemuria and Mira. In the bear version of the game, it includes new games such as juggling, tree climbing, and fishing as well as new wild cat cubs.

Reception

Kinectimals has received mostly positive reviews. Video game talk show Good Games two presenters gave the game a 7 and 7.5 out of 10 saying how it was quite fun and that the player's animal would give instant feedback as well most younger gamers would love playing it. Initially they said "It has a lot more life, energy and fun to it than something like EyePet - there's a lot of sparkle, but I was okay with that."

References

External links
Kinectimals official website
Frontier Developments Official website
Kinectimals Wiki - Kinectimals.info
Kinectimals Achievements List

2010 video games
Android (operating system) games
Frontier Developments games
IOS games
Kinect games
Microsoft games
Video games about animals
Video games about bears
Video games scored by Peter McConnell
Video games with expansion packs
Virtual pet video games
Windows Phone games
Xbox 360 games
Single-player video games
Video games developed in the United Kingdom